Meany, Miny, and Moe are the Walter Lantz characters, who made their first appearance in the Oswald the Lucky Rabbit cartoon "Monkey Wretches" (1935). Their final animated appearance was in 1937 in "The Air Express".

Personalities and development 
According to their theme song, the trio are "just three monkeys from the sticks / just a bunch of jungle hicks / but they know a lot of tricks." At first portrayed as unclothed identical triplets in the Oswald cartoons, the monkeys began wearing clothes and behaving individually when they graduated to their own series. Meany is a wannabe tough guy, often bullying his shyer, clumsier brothers. In animation, the trio rarely speak coherent English, instead rapidly gibbering in an imitation of real-life monkeys.

While usually depicted as monkeys with tails, the three brothers are occasionally drawn tailless, making them look more like chimpanzees.

List of appearances 
 "Monkey Wretches" (11/11/1935) - 1st in Oswald the Lucky Rabbit cartoon
 "Beauty Shoppe" (03/30/1936) - 2nd in Oswald the Lucky Rabbit cartoon
 "Farming Fools" (05/25?/1936) - 3rd in Oswald the Lucky Rabbit cartoon
 "The Battle Royal" (06/22/1936) - 4th and final in Oswald the Lucky Rabbit cartoon
 "Turkey Dinner" (11/30/1936) - 1st solo cartoon
 "Knights For A Day" (12/25/1936)
 "The Golfers" (01/11/1937)
 "House Of Magic" (02/08/1937)
 "The Big Race" (03/08?/1937)
 "The Lumber Camp" (03/15/1937)
 "The Steel Workers" (04/26/1937)
 "The Stevedores" (05/24/1937)
 "The Country Store" (07/05/1937)
 "Firemen's Picnic" (08/16/1937)
 "The Rest Resort" (08/23/1937)
 "Ostrich Feathers" (09/06/1937)
 "The Air Express" (09/20/1937)

Comics appearances 
In the later Lantz comic books Woody Woodpecker Back to School 1 and 2 (1952, 1953), the three monkeys starred in comic stories of their own. The spelling of their names changed to Meeny, Miney and (sometimes) Mo. In the comics, the trio spoke English in a style roughly mimicking the Three Stooges. While Meeny's name no longer exactly matched the word "meany," he was still portrayed as a wannabe tough guy.

See also
 List of Walter Lantz cartoons
 List of Walter Lantz cartoon characters

References

External links 
 The Walter Lantz-o-Pedia

Film characters introduced in 1935
Fictional anthropomorphic characters
Universal Pictures cartoons and characters
Walter Lantz Productions shorts
Fictional monkeys
Walter Lantz Productions cartoons and characters